Daniel C. Tosteson  (February 5, 1925 Milwaukee - May 27, 2009 Boston) was an American academic, and physiologist. He was president of the American Academy of Arts and Sciences from 1997 to 2000.  He graduated from Harvard College and Harvard Medical School.

He taught at Washington University in St. Louis and Duke University. He was Caroline Shields Walker Distinguished Professor of Cell Biology at Harvard University. From 1977 to 1997, he was dean of the Harvard Medical School.

Legacy 
A lecture series in health care policy was named for him.

References 

1925 births
2009 deaths
Harvard Medical School faculty
Washington University School of Medicine faculty
Duke University School of Medicine faculty
Harvard College alumni
Harvard Medical School alumni
Members of the National Academy of Medicine